
Gmina Lubniewice is an urban-rural gmina (administrative district) in Sulęcin County, Lubusz Voivodeship, in western Poland.

Villages
Apart from the town of Lubniewice, Gmina Lubniewice contains the villages and settlements of Glisno, Jarnatów, Osieczyce, Rogi, Sobieraj and Wałdowice.

Neighbouring gminas
Gmina Lubniewice is bordered by the gminas of Bledzew, Deszczno, Krzeszyce and Sulęcin.

Twin towns – sister cities

Gmina Lubniewice is twinned with:
 Sävsjö, Sweden
 Schöneiche bei Berlin, Germany

References

Lubniewice
Sulęcin County